Magare Tshekiso is a Botswana boxer. He competed in the men's bantamweight event at the 1988 Summer Olympics.

References

Year of birth missing (living people)
Living people
Botswana male boxers
Olympic boxers of Botswana
Boxers at the 1988 Summer Olympics
Place of birth missing (living people)
Bantamweight boxers